Compulite is an Israel-based company that designs and builds lighting control console, dimmers and other theatre lighting related equipment.

History
Compulite was founded in 1978 by Dan Redler and Alfred Senator.

In 1978, Compulite was the first company to release a lighting console that uses a microprocessor.

The Compulite Animator, released in 1990, was one of the first consoles to use DMX512 for the generic control of automated fixtures and dimmers simultaneously.

In 2009, Compulite was one of five companies in the world producing high density modular sine-wave dimmers fit for use in theatre.

Management
Compulite is privately owned by Mr. Yehuda Shukrun, the CEO of the company.

In 2015, co-founders Mr. Dan Redler and Mr. Alfred Senator retired.

Products 

Compulite has manufactured a wide range of lighting control products, accessories and software, but is best known for its range of control consoles and dimmer racks.

References

External links
  

Electronics companies of Israel
Stage lighting
Manufacturing companies established in 1978
1978 establishments in Israel